Ning Fukui (born December 1955) is a Chinese diplomat.

Life and career
Ning was born in Qinghe County, Hebei, in December 1955. After graduating from Kim Il-sung University in 1977 he assigned to the Ministry of Foreign Affairs of the People's Republic of China.

He was deputy director of the Asian Affairs of the Ministry of Foreign Affairs of the People's Republic of China from 1955 to 2000.

In 2000 he was promoted to become the Chinese Ambassador to Cambodia, a position he held until 2003.

He was the Chinese Ambassador to South Korea in 2006, and held that office until 2008.

From 2009 to 2011 he served as director of the Department of Boundary and Ocean Affairs of Foreign Affairs of the People's Republic of China.

He became the Deputy Secretary-General of Yunnan in 2011, and served until July 2013.

In August 2013, the Chinese president Hu Jintao appointed Ning Fukui the Chinese Ambassador to Thailand.

References

External links

1955 births
Kim Il-sung University alumni
Living people
Ambassadors of China to Cambodia
Ambassadors of China to South Korea
Ambassadors of China to Thailand
People from Xingtai